Gilles Beaudoin (1919–2007) was a Canadian politician and a former Mayor of Trois-Rivières.

Background

He was born on October 12, 1919.  He owned and managed a furniture store located on rue Champflour.  He was married to Dolorès Blais since 1943 and was the father of five children.

Political career

Beaudoin was elected for the first time as Mayor in 1970.  He was re-elected in 1974, 1978, 1982 and 1986.  He did not run for re-election in 1990.

Achievements

His accomplishments include:

 the advent of the 1975 Jeux du Québec (Quebec Games) finals;
 the beautification of the port of Trois-Rivières;
 the completion of Hôtel Delta'''s convention center;
 the construction of the pont Radisson'' (Radisson Bridge);
 the opening of the Salle J.-Antonio-Thompson concert hall and
 the revitalization of downtown Trois-Rivières.

Retirement from Politics

Beaudoin died on August 22, 2007.

Footnotes

References

1919 births
2007 deaths
Mayors of Trois-Rivières